Wallace Barton Douglas (September 21, 1852 – December 9, 1930) was an American lawyer, jurist, and politician.

Early life and education 
Wallace B. Douglas was born in Leyden, New York on September 21, 1852. He attended the Cazenovia Seminary, and received his law degree from the University of Michigan Law School in 1875.

Career 
Douglas moved to Moorhead, Minnesota in 1883 and practiced law. He served as Moorhead City attorney and Clay County attorney. He also served on the Moorhead Board of Education and was the president of the board. Douglas served in the Minnesota House of Representatives from 1895 to 1899 and was a Republican.

He served as Minnesota Attorney General from 1899 to 1904. He was then appointed to the Minnesota Supreme Court in 1904 and served until 1905. Douglas served as chairman of the Minnesota Board of Forestry. Douglas Lodge in Itasca State Park was named after him.

Personal life 
Douglas died suddenly in Ferndale, Washington on December 9, 1930. He was buried at Prairie Home Cemetery in Moorhead.

References

1852 births
1930 deaths
People from Moorhead, Minnesota
People from Lewis County, New York
Cazenovia College alumni
University of Michigan Law School alumni
School board members in Minnesota
Republican Party members of the Minnesota House of Representatives
Minnesota Attorneys General
Justices of the Minnesota Supreme Court